The Leo Szilard Lectureship Award (originally called the Leo Szilard Award) is given annually by the American Physical Society (APS) for "outstanding accomplishments by physicists in promoting the use of physics for the benefit of society". It is given internationally in commemoration of physicist Leo Szilard.

It is often awarded to physicists early in their careers who are active in areas such as environmental issues, arms control, or science policy.  the recipient is given $3,000 plus $2,000 travel expenses and is expected to lecture at an APS meeting and at educational or research laboratories, to promote awareness of their activities.

Recipients 
The award is given yearly and was first presented in 1974.

 1974 David R. Inglis
 1975 Bernard T. Feld
 1976 Richard Garwin
 1977 not awarded
 1978 Matthew Meselson 
 1979 Sherwood Rowland
 1980 Sidney Drell
 1981 Henry Way Kendall, Hans Bethe
 1982 Wolfgang K. H. Panofsky
 1983 Andrei Sakharov
 1984 Kosta Tsipis
 1985 James B. Pollack, O. Brian Toon, Thomas P. Ackerman, Richard P. Turco, Carl Sagan, John W. Birks, Paul J. Crutzen
 1986 Arthur Rosenfeld
 1987 Thomas B. Cochran
 1988 Robert H. Williams
 1989 Anthony Nero
 1990 Theodore Postol
 1991 John H. Gibbons
 1992 Kurt Gottfried
 1993 Ray Kidder, Roy Woodruff
 1994 Herbert York
 1995 Evgeny Velikhov, Roald Sagdeev
 1996 David Hafemeister
 1997 Thomas L. Neff
 1998 David Baird Goldstein, Howard Geller
 1999 John Alexander Simpson
 2000 Jeremiah David Sullivan
 2001 John Harte
 2002 Henry C. Kelly
 2003 Robert H. Socolow
 2004 Marc Ross
 2005 David K. Barton, Roger Falcone, Daniel Kleppner, Frederick K. Lamb, Ming K. Lau, Harvey L. Lynch, David Moncton, David Montague, David E. Mosher, William Priedhorsky, Maury Tigner, David R. Vaughan
 2006 Paul G. Richards
 2007 James E. Hansen
 2008 Anatoli Diyakov, Pavel Podvig
 2009 Raymond Jeanloz
 2010 Frank von Hippel
 2011 John F. Ahearne
 2012 Siegfried Hecker
 2013 Geoffrey West
 2014 M. V. Ramana, Ramamurti Rajaraman
 2015 Ashok Gadgil
 2016 Joel Primack
 2017 James Timbie
 2018 Edwin Stuart Lyman
 2019 Zia Mian
 2020 France A. Córdova

See also
 List of physics awards

References

Awards of the American Physical Society
Science in society